Pro League may refer to various association football leagues:

 Belgian Pro League, the top tier of football in Belgium
 ESL Pro League, an international Counter-Strike: Global Offensive competition
 Men's FIH Pro League, an international men's field hockey competition
 Women's FIH Pro League, an international women's field hockey competition
 League of Legends Pro League, top tier of League of Legends in China
 Lega Pro, a third-tier football league in Italy
 Malagasy Pro League, the top tier of football in Madagascar
 Persian Gulf Pro League, the top tier of football in Iran
 Provincial League, a former football league in Thailand
 TT Pro League, the top tier of football in Trinidad and Tobago
 UAE Pro League, the top tier of football in the United Arab Emirates
 USL Pro, a third-tier football league in the United States
 Uzbekistan Pro League, the second football league in Uzbekistan